Danielle Carter is an Australian actress. She has acted in a number of popular television shows, films and plays.

She graduated from Australia's National Institute of Dramatic Art, (NIDA) in 1993.

In 2016, Carter performed in the Ensemble Theatre production of Jane Caferella's e-baby, a two-hander play where she played the genetic mother of IVF embryos in a gestational surrogacy arrangement. In a review for The Guardian, Clarissa Sebag-Montefiore said her performance was "brilliantly skittish".  Carter and Gabrielle Scawthorn were described as bringing "such life to their roles" and being "utterly believable – in equal parts loveable and frustrating – [so that] the heartbreak, when it comes, is visceral."  It was the Sydney premiere of the play, which had only previously been produced in Melbourne in 2015, and was Caferella's first full-length play.

Film 
In 2009 she appeared in the Nicolas Cage movie Knowing as 'Miss Taylor (1959)'.

Filmography

Film

Television

Reference list

External links
 
Danielle Carter, National Film and Sound Archive-Australia, Retrieved 19 March 2010

Australian film actresses
Place of birth missing (living people)
Australian stage actresses
Australian television actresses
Year of birth missing (living people)
Living people
National Institute of Dramatic Art alumni